Papuexul is a genus of air-breathing land snails, terrestrial pulmonate gastropod mollusks in the family Camaenidae.

Species
Species within the genus Papuexul include:
 Papuexul bidwilli Reeve, 1853

References

External links

 
Camaenidae
Taxonomy articles created by Polbot